Haskins may refer to:

 Haskins (surname)
 Haskins, Iowa, U.S.
 Haskins, Ohio, U.S.
 Haskins Laboratories, non-profit researcher

See also
 Haskin (disambiguation)
 Hoskins (disambiguation)